The M13 is a metropolitan route in the City of Cape Town, South Africa  linking Durbanville to Milnerton, north of the city of Cape Town.

Route 
It winds through the hilly wine-producing valley, curving northwards and then creating a rather sharp and steep westerly curve near the Hillcrest Quarry towards the coast to descend down the hills.

References 

Metropolitan routes in Cape Town